The Esbjerg Stadium, known as the Blue Water Arena for sponsorship reasons, is a football stadium located within Esbjerg Idrætspark in Esbjerg, Denmark. It is the home ground of Esbjerg fB and has a capacity of 16,942, of which 11,451 is seated. It is currently the second-biggest stadium in Jutland, and the fourth-biggest in Denmark.

In 1999, the stadium was venue of the football tournament at the European Youth Olympic Festival.

On account of the 2008 UEFA qualifier fan attack resulting in the forbidding of play of UEFA qualifier matches for Denmark within 250 km of Copenhagen, the Esbjerg Stadium was mentioned as the only possible venue within Denmark in which Denmark UEFA qualifier home games can be held as it is the biggest stadium in the country more than 250 km from Copenhagen. UEFA later changed the verdict, and on July 9, 2007 the Danish Football Association announced that the games against Spain and Liechtenstein would be played in Århus and the games against Latvia and Iceland would be played in Copenhagen.

National games
Esbjerg Stadium has twice been used as home ground for the Danish national team. Further it has been venue of several youth national matches:

Footnotes

See also
 Esbjerg fB
 Esbjerg Skøjtehal
 Esbjerg Stadionhal
 List of football stadiums in Denmark

References

External links
  Blue Water Arena at Sport & Event Park Esbjerg
  Renovation blog

Football venues in Denmark
Esbjerg fB
Buildings and structures in Esbjerg
Sports venues in the Region of Southern Denmark